(German for House of the teacher) is a building in Berlin, located near Alexanderplatz, built between 1962 and 1964 under the German Democratic Republic. Its most notable feature is a mural wrapping around the entire building and extending between the second and fifth above-ground floors. Designed in the style of Mexican mural art by artist Walter Womacka, it is titled Unser Leben ("Our Life") and depicts various occupational groups of and aspects of life in the GDR.

Adjacent to the building is a two-story congress hall, known since November 2003 as Berliner Congress Center. Between 2003 and 2011, the annual Chaos Communication Congress was hosted there.

See also

Project Blinkenlights

External links
 Feature on Haus des Lehrers by TV Berlin 

Buildings and structures in Berlin